Liberty Township is a civil township of Wexford County in the U.S. state of Michigan. The population was 861 at the 2010 census.

Communities
Haire is a former settlement within the township that was settled as a lumber community along the Grand Rapids and Indiana Railroad.  The post office in Haire operated from August 21, 1883 until December 15, 1908.

Geography

The Manistee River flows through the center of the township.

Major highways
 runs south–north through the center of the township.
 enters from the south from Manton and ends at U.S. Route 131 in the center of the township.

Demographics
As of the 2010 United States Census, there were 861 people, 406 households, and 235 families in the township. The population density was 23.6 per square mile (8.5/km).  The housing density was 11.1 per square mile (4.2/km). The racial makeup of the township was 96.3% White, 0.9% Hispanic or Latino, 0.7% Native American, 0.5% Asian, and 2.6% were two or more races.

25.0%% of households had children under the age of 18 living with them, 62.4% were married couples living together, 6.8% had a female householder with no husband present, and 27.0% were non-families. The average household size was 2.64 and the average family size was 3.04.

The township population contained 25.0% under the age of 18, 6.2% from 18 to 24, 22.5% from 25 to 44, 30.8% from 45 to 64, and 15.6% who were 65 years of age or older. The median age was 43 years. For every 100 females, there were 97 males.

The median income for a household in the township was $43,864, and the median income for a family was $40,781. Males had a median income of $28,162 versus $21,250 for females. The per capita income for the township was $17,612. About 5.7% of families and 9.2% of the population were below the poverty line, including 8.3% of those under age 18 and 7.2% of those age 65 or over.

Education
Liberty Township is served entirely by Manton Consolidated Schools just to the south in the city of Manton.

References

Townships in Michigan
Townships in Wexford County, Michigan